The 113th United States Congress was a meeting of the legislative branch of the United States federal government, from January 3, 2013, to January 3, 2015, during the fifth and sixth years of Barack Obama's presidency. It was composed of the United States Senate and the United States House of Representatives based on the results of the 2012 Senate elections and the 2012 House elections. The seats in the House were apportioned based on the 2010 United States census. It first met in Washington, D.C. on January 3, 2013, and it ended on January 3, 2015. Senators elected to regular terms in 2008 were in the last two years of those terms during this Congress.

The Senate had a Democratic majority, while the House had a Republican majority; such a split would not be repeated until the 118th Congress. This was the last time Democrats held control of the Senate until the 117th Congress in 2021.

Major events

 January 4, 2013: Joint session to count the Electoral College votes for the 2012 presidential election.
 January 20–21, 2013: Second inauguration of President Barack Obama. The term began January 20, but because that was a Sunday, the Joint Committee on Inaugural Ceremonies scheduled the inauguration ceremony for the next day.
 February 1, 2013: Senator Mo Cowan began his term after being appointed by Massachusetts Governor Deval Patrick. Serving alongside Senator Tim Scott of South Carolina, this marked the first time that two African Americans served concurrently in the Senate.
 February 12, 2013: Joint session to hear the 2013 State of the Union Address.
 March 6–7, 2013: Senator Rand Paul led a filibuster of the nomination of John O. Brennan for Director of the Central Intelligence Agency with a 12-hour, 52-minute speech.
 June 5, 2013: The first media reports of Edward Snowden's surveillance disclosures surfaced in the media.
 June 25, 2013: The Supreme Court struck down section 4(b) of the Voting Rights Act of 1965 in Shelby County v. Holder, ending the need for some counties and states to receive "preclearance" from the Justice Department before changing election laws.
 June 26, 2013: The Supreme Court struck down section 3 of the Defense of Marriage Act in United States v. Windsor, forcing the federal government to acknowledge same-sex marriages granted under the laws of states.
 July 16, 2013: The Senate reached a deal to allow some presidential nominations to come to a vote, avoiding the "Nuclear option" for filibuster reform.
 September 24–25, 2013: Senator Ted Cruz delivered a 21-hour, 19-minute speech, one of the longest in Senate history, in opposition to the Affordable Care Act. Cruz's speech was not a filibuster, as it delayed no vote.
 October 1–17, 2013: The United States federal government was shut down as most routine operations were curtailed after Congress failed to enact legislation appropriating funds for fiscal year 2014, or a continuing resolution for the interim authorization of appropriations for fiscal year 2014.
 October 3, 2013: The shooting of Miriam Carey occurs.
 November 21, 2013: In a 52–48 vote, the Senate ended the use of the filibuster on all executive branch nominees, as well as on most judicial nominees. The filibuster remained in place for Supreme Court nominees and for legislation.
 November 4, 2014: United States elections, 2014, including United States Senate elections, 2014 and United States House of Representatives elections, 2014.

Major legislation

Enacted 

 March 7, 2013: Violence Against Women Reauthorization Act of 2013, 
 March 13, 2013: Pandemic and All-Hazards Preparedness Reauthorization Act of 2013, 
 March 26, 2013: 2013 United States federal budget (as Consolidated and Further Continuing Appropriations Act, 2013), 
 June 3, 2013: Stolen Valor Act of 2013, 
 June 3, 2013: Freedom to Fish Act, Pub.L. 113-13
 June 9, 2013: Sandia Pueblo Settlement Technical Amendment Act, Pub.L. 113-19
 June 13, 2013: Animal Drug and Animal Generic Drug User Fee Reauthorization Act, Pub.L. 113-14
 July 18, 2013: South Utah Valley Electric Conveyance Act, Pub.L. 113-19
 July 18, 2013: Bonneville Unit Clean Hydropower Facilitation Act, Pub.L. 113-20
 August 9, 2013: Hydropower Regulatory Efficiency Act of 2013, 
 August 9, 2013: FOR VETS Act of 2013, Pub.L. 113-26
 August 9, 2013: Bipartisan Student Loan Certainty Act of 2013, 
 September 18, 2013: Powell Shooting Range Land Conveyance Act, Pub.L. 113-32
 September 30, 2013: Missing Children's Assistance Reauthorization Act of 2013, Pub.L. 113-38
 September 30, 2013: Pay Our Military Act, 
 October 2, 2013: Organization of American States Revitalization and Reform Act of 2013, Pub.L. 113-41
 October 4, 2013: Congressional Award Program Reauthorization Act of 2013, Pub.L. 113-43
 October 17, 2013: Continuing Appropriations Act, 2014, Pub.L. 113-46
 October 31, 2013: United States Parole Commission Extension Act of 2013, Pub.L. 113-47
 November 21, 2013: Streamlining Claims Processing for Federal Contractor Employees Act, Pub.L. 113-50
 November 21, 2013: HIV Organ Policy Equity (HOPE) Act, Pub.L. 113-51
 November 27, 2013: Small Airplane Revitalization Act of 2013, Pub.L. 113-53
 November 27, 2013: Drug Quality and Security Act, 
 November 27, 2013: PREEMIE Reauthorization Act, Pub.L. 113-55
 December 20, 2013: Community Fire Safety Act of 2013, Pub.L. 113-64
 December 26, 2013: National Defense Authorization Act for Fiscal Year 2014, 
 December 26, 2013: Bipartisan Budget Act of 2013, Pub.L. 113-67
 December 26, 2013: Alaska Native Tribal Health Consortium Land Transfer Act, Pub.L. 113-68
 January 17, 2014: Consolidated Appropriations Act, 2014, 
 February 7, 2014: Agricultural Act of 2014, 
 February 12, 2014: Support for United States-Republic of Korea Civil Nuclear Cooperation Act, Pub.L. 113-81
 March 6, 2014: National Integrated Drought Information System Reauthorization Act of 2013, Pub.L. 113-86
 March 13, 2014: Sleeping Bear Dunes National Lakeshore Conservation and Recreation Act, Pub.L. 113-87
 March 21, 2014: Homeowner Flood Insurance Affordability Act of 2014, 
 March 21, 2014: Home Heating Emergency Assistance Through Transportation (HHEATT) Act, Pub.L. 113-90
 March 25, 2014: Philippines Charitable Giving Assistance Act, Pub.L. 113-92
 April 3, 2014: Gabriella Miller Kids First Research Act, 
 April 3, 2014: Support for the Sovereignty, Integrity, Democracy, and Economic Stability of Ukraine Act of 2014, 
 April 3, 2014: United States International Programming to Ukraine and Neighboring Regions Act, Pub.L. 113-96
 April 7, 2014: Cooperative and Small Employer Charity Pension Flexibility Act, Pub.L. 113-97
 April 7, 2014: Children's Hospital GME Support Reauthorization Act of 2013, Pub.L. 113-98
 May 9, 2014: Digital Accountability and Transparency Act (DATA), 
 May 20, 2014: Kilah Davenport Child Protection Act, 
 June 9, 2014: North Texas Invasive Species Barrier Act of 2014, Pub.L. 113-117
 June 10, 2014: Water Resources Reform and Development Act, 
 June 30, 2014: Collinsville Renewable Energy Promotion Act, Pub.L. 113-122
 June 30, 2014: Reliable Home Heating Act, Pub.L. 113-125
 July 7, 2014: Intelligence Authorization Act for Fiscal Year 2014, Pub.L. 113-126
 July 23, 2014: Workforce Innovation and Opportunity Act, 
 July 25, 2014: Black Hills Cemetery Act, Pub.L. 113-131
 July 25, 2014: Hill Creek Cultural Preservation and Energy Development Act, Pub.L. 113-133
 July 25, 2014: Three Kids Mine Remediation and Reclamation Act, Pub. L. 113-135
 July 25, 2014: Lake Hills Administrative Site Affordable Housing Act, Pub.L. 113-141
 July 25, 2014: Huna Tlingit Traditional Gull Egg Use Act, Pub.L. 113-142
 August 1, 2014: Veterinary Medicine Mobility Act, Pub.L. 113-143
 August 1, 2014: Unlocking Consumer Choice and Wireless Competition Act, 
 August 7, 2014: Veterans' Access to Care through Choice, Accountability, and Transparency Act of 2014, 
 August 8, 2014: Improving Trauma Care Act, Pub.L. 113-152
 August 8, 2014: Money Remittances Improvement Act, Pub.L. 113-156
 August 8, 2014: Autism CARES Act of 2014, Pub.L. 113-157
 August 8, 2014: Emergency Afghan Allies Extension Act of 2014, Pub.L. 113-160
 August 8, 2014: Victims of Child Abuse Act Reauthorization Act of 2013, Pub.L. 113-163
 September 19, 2014: Continuing Appropriations Resolution, 2015, Pub.L. 113-164
 September 26, 2014: Paul D. Wellstone Muscular Dystrophy Community Assistance, Research and Education Amendments of 2013, Pub.L. 113-166
 September 26, 2014: All Circuit Review Extension Act, Pub.L. 113-170
 September 26, 2014: Gun Lake Trust Land Reaffirmation Act, Pub.L. 113-179
 September 26, 2014: Emergency Medical Services for Children Reauthorization Act of 2014, Pub.L. 113-180
 September 29, 2014: Preventing Sex Trafficking and Strengthening Families Act, 
 October 6, 2014: IMPACT Act of 2014, 
 November 26, 2014: Presidential and Federal Records Act Amendments of 2014, 
 November 26, 2014: Government Reports Elimination Act of 2014, 
 November 26, 2014: Sunscreen Innovation Act, Pub.L. 113-195
 December 4, 2014: STELA Reauthorization Act of 2014, Pub.L. 113-200
 December 16, 2014: Honor Flight Act, Pub.L. 113-221
 December 18, 2014: Permanent Electronic Duck Stamp Act of 2013, Pub.L. 113-239
 December 18, 2014: Death in Custody Reporting Act of 2013, 
 December 18, 2014: Transportation Security Acquisition Reform Act, 
 December 18, 2014: American Savings Promotion Act, 
 December 18, 2014: Credit Union Share Insurance Fund Parity Act, 
 December 18, 2014: Smart Savings Act, Pub.L. 113-255
 December 18, 2014: Designer Anabolic Steroid Control Act of 2014, Pub.L. 113-260
 December 18, 2014: EPS Service Parts Act of 2014 
 December 18, 2014: Ukraine Freedom Support Act of 2014, Pub. L. 113-272
 December 18, 2014: Transportation Security Acquisition Reform Act, Pub.L. 113-275
 December 18, 2014: Venezuela Defense of Human Rights and Civil Society Act of 2014, 
 December 18, 2014: Insurance Capital Standards Clarification Act of 2014, 
 December 18, 2014: Howard Coble Coast Guard and Maritime Transportation Act of 2014, Pub.L. 113-281
 December 18, 2014: Federal Information Security Modernization Act of 2014, Pub.L. 113-283
 December 19, 2014: Carl Levin and Howard P. "Buck" McKeon National Defense Authorization Act for Fiscal Year 2015, Pub.L. 113-291
 December 19, 2014: United States-Israel Strategic Partnership Act of 2014, Pub.L. 113-296

Proposed 

 2014 United States federal budget: , 
 Assault Weapons Ban of 2013 - Introduced after Sandy Hook Elementary School shooting
 Justice Safety Valve Act of 2013: , 
 Marketplace Fairness Act of 2013: - Also known as the "Internet Sales Tax"
 Border Security, Economic Opportunity, and Immigration Modernization Act of 2013 - Also known as the immigration bill

Appropriations bills

Fiscal year 2014
Fiscal year 2014 runs from October 1, 2013, to September 30, 2014.
 Military Construction and Veterans Affairs, and Related Agencies Appropriations Act, 2014 - proposed
 Department of Homeland Security Appropriations Act, 2014 - proposed
 Energy and Water Development and Related Agencies Appropriations Act, 2014 - proposed

Fiscal year 2015

Fiscal year 2015 runs from October 1, 2014, to September 20, 2015.
 Agriculture, Rural Development, Food and Drug Administration, and Related Agencies Appropriations Act, 2015 - considered in the House on June 11, 2014. The bill would appropriate $20.9 billion.
 Commerce, Justice, Science, and Related Agencies Appropriations Act, 2015 - passed the House on May 30, 2014. The total amount of money appropriated in the bill was $51.2 billion, approximately $400 million less than fiscal year 2014.
 Department of Defense Appropriations Act, 2015 - considered in the House on June 18, 2014. The bill would provide funding of approximately $491 billion.
 Energy and Water Development and Related Agencies Appropriations Act, 2015 (H.R. 4923; 113th Congress) - The bill would appropriate $34 billion to the United States Department of Energy, the United States Army Corps of Engineers, and related agencies.
 Legislative Branch Appropriations Act, 2015 - passed in the House on May 1, 2014. The bill would appropriate $3.3 billion to the legislative branch for FY 2015.
 Military Construction and Veterans Affairs and Related Agencies Appropriations Act, 2015 - passed the House on April 30, 2014. The total amount appropriated by the introduced version of the bill is $71.5 billion.
 Transportation, Housing and Urban Development, and Related Agencies Appropriations Act, 2015 ( or "THUD") - passed the House on June 10, 2014. The bill would appropriate $17 billion to the Department of Transportation and $40.3 billion to the Department of Housing and Urban Development.

Party summary
Resignations and new members are discussed in the "Changes in membership" section, below.

Senate

House of Representatives

Leadership

Senate

 President: Joe Biden (D)
 President pro tempore: Patrick Leahy (D)

Majority (Democratic) leadership
 Majority Leader and Caucus Chairman: Harry Reid
 Assistant Majority Leader (Majority Whip): Dick Durbin
 Democratic Caucus Vice Chairman and Policy Committee Chairman: Chuck Schumer
 Democratic Caucus Secretary: Patty Murray
 Senatorial Campaign Committee Chairman: Michael Bennet
 Policy Committee Vice Chairman: Debbie Stabenow
 Steering and Outreach Committee Chairman: Mark Begich
 Steering and Outreach Committee Vice Chairman: Jeanne Shaheen
 Chief Deputy Whip: Barbara Boxer

Minority (Republican) leadership
 Minority Leader: Mitch McConnell
 Assistant Minority Leader (Minority Whip): John Cornyn
 Republican Conference Chairman: John Thune
 Republican Conference Vice Chairman: Roy Blunt
 Senatorial Committee Chair: Jerry Moran
 Policy Committee Chairman: John Barrasso
 Deputy Whips: Roy Blunt, Richard Burr, Mike Crapo, Saxby Chambliss, Rob Portman, David Vitter, Roger Wicker

House of Representatives

 Speaker: John Boehner (R)

Majority (Republican) leadership
 Majority Leader: Eric Cantor, until August 1, 2014
 Kevin McCarthy, from August 1, 2014
 Majority Whip: Kevin McCarthy, until August 1, 2014
 Steve Scalise, from August 1, 2014
 Majority Chief Deputy Whip: Peter Roskam, until August 1, 2014
 Patrick McHenry, from August 1, 2014
 Republican Conference Chairwoman: Cathy McMorris Rodgers
 Republican Conference Vice-Chairwoman: Lynn Jenkins
 Republican Conference Secretary: Virginia Foxx
 Republican Campaign Committee Chairman: Greg Walden
 Policy Committee Chairman: James Lankford
Campaign Committee Deputy Chairman: Lynn Westmoreland

Minority (Democratic) leadership
 Minority Leader: Nancy Pelosi
 Minority Whip: Steny Hoyer
 Assistant Democratic Leader: Jim Clyburn
 Democratic Caucus Chairman: Xavier Becerra
 Democratic Caucus Vice-Chairman: Joseph Crowley
 Democratic Campaign Committee Chairman: Steve Israel
 Steering and Policy Committee Co-Chairs: Rosa DeLauro (Steering) and Rob Andrews (Policy, until February 18, 2014); George Miller (Policy, from March 24, 2014)
 Organization, Study, and Review Chairman: Mike Capuano
 Senior Chief Deputy Minority Whip: John Lewis
 Chief Deputy Minority Whips: Terri Sewell, Keith Ellison, Jim Matheson, Ben R. Luján, Jan Schakowsky, Diana DeGette, G. K. Butterfield, Debbie Wasserman Schultz, Peter Welch

Members

Senate
Senators are listed by state, and the numbers refer to their Senate classes, In this Congress, Class 2 meant their term ended with this Congress, requiring re-election in 2014; Class 3 meant their term began in the last Congress, requiring re-election in 2016; and Class 1 meant their term began in this Congress, requiring re-election in 2018.

Alabama
 2. Jeff Sessions (R)
 3. Richard Shelby (R)

Alaska
 2. Mark Begich (D)
 3. Lisa Murkowski (R)

Arizona
 1. Jeff Flake (R)
 3. John McCain (R)

Arkansas
 2. Mark Pryor (D)
 3. John Boozman (R)

California
 1. Dianne Feinstein (D)
 3. Barbara Boxer (D)

Colorado
 2. Mark Udall (D)
 3. Michael Bennet (D)

Connecticut
 1. Chris Murphy (D)
 3. Richard Blumenthal (D)

Delaware
 1. Tom Carper (D)
 2. Chris Coons (D)

Florida
 1. Bill Nelson (D)
 3. Marco Rubio (R)

Georgia
 2. Saxby Chambliss (R)
 3. Johnny Isakson (R)

Hawaii
 1. Mazie Hirono (D)
 3. Brian Schatz (D)

Idaho
 2. Jim Risch (R)
 3. Mike Crapo (R)

Illinois
 2. Dick Durbin (D)
 3. Mark Kirk (R)

Indiana
 1. Joe Donnelly (D)
 3. Dan Coats (R)

Iowa
 2. Tom Harkin (D)
 3. Chuck Grassley (R)

Kansas
 2. Pat Roberts (R)
 3. Jerry Moran (R)

Kentucky
 2. Mitch McConnell (R)
 3. Rand Paul (R)

Louisiana
 2. Mary Landrieu (D)
 3. David Vitter (R)

Maine
 1. Angus King (I)
 2. Susan Collins (R)

Maryland
 1. Ben Cardin (D)
 3. Barbara Mikulski (D)

Massachusetts
 1. Elizabeth Warren (D)
 2. John Kerry (D), until February 1, 2013
 Mo Cowan (D), February 1, 2013 – July 16, 2013
 Ed Markey (D), from July 16, 2013

Michigan
 1. Debbie Stabenow (D)
 2. Carl Levin (D)

Minnesota
 1. Amy Klobuchar (DFL)
 2. Al Franken (DFL)

Mississippi
 1. Roger Wicker (R)
 2. Thad Cochran (R)

Missouri
 1. Claire McCaskill (D)
 3. Roy Blunt (R)

Montana
 1. Jon Tester (D)
 2. Max Baucus (D), until February 6, 2014
 John Walsh (D), from February 9, 2014

Nebraska
 1. Deb Fischer (R)
 2. Mike Johanns (R)

Nevada
 1. Dean Heller (R)
 3. Harry Reid (D)

New Hampshire
 2. Jeanne Shaheen (D)
 3. Kelly Ayotte (R)

New Jersey
 1. Bob Menendez (D)
 2. Frank Lautenberg (D), until June 3, 2013
 Jeffrey Chiesa (R), June 6, 2013 – October 31, 2013
 Cory Booker (D), from October 31, 2013

New Mexico
 1. Martin Heinrich (D)
 2. Tom Udall (D)

New York
 1. Kirsten Gillibrand (D)
 3. Chuck Schumer (D)

North Carolina
 2. Kay Hagan (D)
 3. Richard Burr (R)

North Dakota
 1. Heidi Heitkamp (D-NPL)
 3. John Hoeven (R)

Ohio
 1. Sherrod Brown (D)
 3. Rob Portman (R)

Oklahoma
 2. Jim Inhofe (R)
 3. Tom Coburn (R)

Oregon
 2. Jeff Merkley (D)
 3. Ron Wyden (D)

Pennsylvania
 1. Bob Casey Jr. (D)
 3. Pat Toomey (R)

Rhode Island
 1. Sheldon Whitehouse (D)
 2. Jack Reed (D)

South Carolina
 2. Lindsey Graham (R)
 3. Tim Scott (R)

South Dakota
 2. Tim Johnson (D)
 3. John Thune (R)

Tennessee
 1. Bob Corker (R)
 2. Lamar Alexander (R)

Texas
 1. Ted Cruz (R)
 2. John Cornyn (R)

Utah
 1. Orrin Hatch (R)
 3. Mike Lee (R)

Vermont
 1. Bernie Sanders (I)
 3. Patrick Leahy (D)

Virginia
 1. Tim Kaine (D)
 2. Mark Warner (D)

Washington
 1. Maria Cantwell (D)
 3. Patty Murray (D)

West Virginia
 1. Joe Manchin (D)
 2. Jay Rockefeller (D)

Wisconsin
 1. Tammy Baldwin (D)
 3. Ron Johnson (R)

Wyoming
 1. John Barrasso (R)
 2. Mike Enzi (R)

House of Representatives

Alabama
 . Jo Bonner (R), until August 2, 2013
 Bradley Byrne (R), from January 7, 2014
 . Martha Roby (R)
 . Mike Rogers (R)
 . Robert Aderholt (R)
 . Mo Brooks (R)
 . Spencer Bachus (R)
 . Terri Sewell (D)

Alaska
 . Don Young (R)

Arizona
 . Ann Kirkpatrick (D)
 . Ron Barber (D)
 . Raúl Grijalva (D)
 . Paul Gosar (R)
 . Matt Salmon (R)
 . David Schweikert (R)
 . Ed Pastor (D)
 . Trent Franks (R)
 . Kyrsten Sinema (D)

Arkansas
 . Rick Crawford (R)
 . Tim Griffin (R)
 . Steve Womack (R)
 . Tom Cotton (R)

California
 . Doug LaMalfa (R)
 . Jared Huffman (D)
 . John Garamendi (D)
 . Tom McClintock (R)
 . Mike Thompson (D)
 . Doris Matsui (D)
 . Ami Bera (D)
 . Paul Cook (R)
 . Jerry McNerney (D)
 . Jeff Denham (R)
 . George Miller (D)
 . Nancy Pelosi (D)
 . Barbara Lee (D)
 . Jackie Speier (D)
 . Eric Swalwell (D)
 . Jim Costa (D)
 . Mike Honda (D)
 . Anna Eshoo (D)
 . Zoe Lofgren (D)
 . Sam Farr (D)
 . David Valadao (R)
 . Devin Nunes (R)
 . Kevin McCarthy (R)
 . Lois Capps (D)
 . Buck McKeon (R)
 . Julia Brownley (D)
 . Judy Chu (D)
 . Adam Schiff (D)
 . Tony Cardenas (D)
 . Brad Sherman (D)
 . Gary Miller (R)
 . Grace Napolitano (D)
 . Henry Waxman (D)
 . Xavier Becerra (D)
 . Gloria Negrete McLeod (D)
 . Raul Ruiz (D)
 . Karen Bass (D)
 . Linda Sanchez (D)
 . Ed Royce (R)
 . Lucille Roybal-Allard (D)
 . Mark Takano (D)
 . Ken Calvert (R)
 . Maxine Waters (D)
 . Janice Hahn (D)
 . John Campbell (R)
 . Loretta Sanchez (D)
 . Alan Lowenthal (D)
 . Dana Rohrabacher (R)
 . Darrell Issa (R)
 . Duncan D. Hunter (R)
 . Juan Vargas (D)
 . Scott Peters (D)
 . Susan Davis (D)

Colorado
 . Diana DeGette (D)
 . Jared Polis (D)
 . Scott Tipton (R)
 . Cory Gardner (R)
 . Doug Lamborn (R)
 . Mike Coffman (R)
 . Ed Perlmutter (D)

Connecticut
 . John Larson (D)
 . Joe Courtney (D)
 . Rosa DeLauro (D)
 . Jim Himes (D)
 . Elizabeth Esty (D)

Delaware
 . John Carney (D)

Florida
 . Jeff Miller (R)
 . Steve Southerland (R)
 . Ted Yoho (R)
 . Ander Crenshaw (R)
 . Corrine Brown (D)
 . Ron DeSantis (R)
 . John Mica (R)
 . Bill Posey (R)
 . Alan Grayson (D)
 . Daniel Webster (R)
 . Rich Nugent (R)
 . Gus Bilirakis (R)
 . Bill Young (R), until October 18, 2013
 David Jolly (R), from March 13, 2014
 . Kathy Castor (D)
 . Dennis Ross (R)
 . Vern Buchanan (R)
 . Tom Rooney (R)
 . Patrick Murphy (D)
 . Trey Radel (R), until January 27, 2014
 Curt Clawson (R), from June 25, 2014
 . Alcee Hastings (D)
 . Ted Deutch (D)
 . Lois Frankel (D)
 . Debbie Wasserman Schultz (D)
 . Frederica Wilson (D)
 . Mario Diaz-Balart (R)
 . Joe Garcia (D)
 . Ileana Ros-Lehtinen (R)

Georgia
 . Jack Kingston (R)
 . Sanford Bishop (D)
 . Lynn Westmoreland (R)
 . Hank Johnson (D)
 . John Lewis (D)
 . Tom Price (R)
 . Rob Woodall (R)
 . Austin Scott (R)
 . Doug Collins (R)
 . Paul Broun (R)
 . Phil Gingrey (R)
 . John Barrow (D)
 . David Scott (D)
 . Tom Graves (R)

Hawaii
 . Colleen Hanabusa (D)
 . Tulsi Gabbard (D)

Idaho
 . Raul Labrador (R)
 . Mike Simpson (R)

Illinois
 . Bobby Rush (D)
 . Robin Kelly (D), from April 9, 2013
 . Dan Lipinski (D)
 . Luis Gutiérrez (D)
 . Mike Quigley (D)
 . Peter Roskam (R)
 . Danny K. Davis (D)
 . Tammy Duckworth (D)
 . Jan Schakowsky (D)
 . Brad Schneider (D)
 . Bill Foster (D)
 . William Enyart (D)
 . Rodney L. Davis (R)
 . Randy Hultgren (R)
 . John Shimkus (R)
 . Adam Kinzinger (R)
 . Cheri Bustos (D)
 . Aaron Schock (R)

Indiana
 . Pete Visclosky (D)
 . Jackie Walorski (R)
 . Marlin Stutzman (R)
 . Todd Rokita (R)
 . Susan Brooks (R)
 . Luke Messer (R)
 . André Carson (D)
 . Larry Bucshon (R)
 . Todd Young (R)

Iowa
 . Bruce Braley (D)
 . David Loebsack (D)
 . Tom Latham (R)
 . Steve King (R)

Kansas
 . Tim Huelskamp (R)
 . Lynn Jenkins (R)
 . Kevin Yoder (R)
 . Mike Pompeo (R)

Kentucky
 . Ed Whitfield (R)
 . Brett Guthrie (R)
 . John Yarmuth (D)
 . Thomas Massie (R)
 . Hal Rogers (R)
 . Andy Barr (R)

Louisiana
 . Steve Scalise (R)
 . Cedric Richmond (D)
 . Charles Boustany (R)
 . John Fleming (R)
 . Rodney Alexander (R), until September 26, 2013
 Vance McAllister (R), from November 21, 2013
 . Bill Cassidy (R)

Maine
 . Chellie Pingree (D)
 . Mike Michaud (D)

Maryland
 . Andrew Harris (R)
 . Dutch Ruppersberger (D)
 . John Sarbanes (D)
 . Donna Edwards (D)
 . Steny Hoyer (D)
 . John Delaney (D)
 . Elijah Cummings (D)
 . Chris Van Hollen (D)

Massachusetts
 . Richard Neal (D)
 . Jim McGovern (D)
 . Niki Tsongas (D)
 . Joseph P. Kennedy III (D)
 . Ed Markey (D), until July 15, 2013
 Katherine Clark (D), from December 12, 2013
 . John Tierney (D)
 . Mike Capuano (D)
 . Stephen Lynch (D)
 . Bill Keating (D)

Michigan
 . Dan Benishek (R)
 . Bill Huizenga (R)
 . Justin Amash (R)
 . Dave Camp (R)
 . Dan Kildee (D)
 . Fred Upton (R)
 . Tim Walberg (R)
 . Mike Rogers (R)
 . Sander Levin (D)
 . Candice Miller (R)
 . Kerry Bentivolio (R)
 . John Dingell (D)
 . John Conyers (D)
 . Gary Peters (D)

Minnesota
 . Tim Walz (DFL)
 . John Kline (R)
 . Erik Paulsen (R)
 . Betty McCollum (DFL)
 . Keith Ellison (DFL)
 . Michele Bachmann (R)
 . Collin Peterson (DFL)
 . Rick Nolan (DFL)

Mississippi
 . Alan Nunnelee (R)
 . Bennie Thompson (D)
 . Gregg Harper (R)
 . Steven Palazzo (R)

Missouri
 . Lacy Clay (D)
 . Ann Wagner (R)
 . Blaine Luetkemeyer (R)
 . Vicky Hartzler (R)
 . Emanuel Cleaver (D)
 . Sam Graves (R)
 . Billy Long (R)
 . Jo Ann Emerson (R), until January 22, 2013
 Jason T. Smith (R), from June 4, 2013

Montana
 . Steve Daines (R)

Nebraska
 . Jeff Fortenberry (R)
 . Lee Terry (R)
 . Adrian M. Smith (R)

Nevada
 . Dina Titus (D)
 . Mark Amodei (R)
 . Joe Heck (R)
 . Steven Horsford (D)

New Hampshire
 . Carol Shea-Porter (D)
 . Annie Kuster (D)

New Jersey
 . Rob Andrews (D) until February 18, 2014
 Donald Norcross (D), from November 12, 2014
 . Frank LoBiondo (R)
 . Jon Runyan (R)
 . Chris Smith (R)
 . Scott Garrett (R)
 . Frank Pallone (D)
 . Leonard Lance (R)
 . Albio Sires (D)
 . Bill Pascrell (D)
 . Donald Payne Jr. (D)
 . Rodney Frelinghuysen (R)
 . Rush Holt Jr. (D)

New Mexico
 . Michelle Lujan Grisham (D)
 . Steve Pearce (R)
 . Ben Ray Luján (D)

New York
 . Tim Bishop (D)
 . Peter King (R)
 . Steve Israel (D)
 . Carolyn McCarthy (D)
 . Gregory Meeks (D)
 . Grace Meng (D)
 . Nydia Velazquez (D)
 . Hakeem Jeffries (D)
 . Yvette Clarke (D)
 . Jerry Nadler (D)
 . Michael Grimm (R)
 . Carolyn Maloney (D)
 . Charles Rangel (D)
 . Joe Crowley (D)
 . Jose E. Serrano (D)
 . Eliot Engel (D)
 . Nita Lowey (D)
 . Sean Patrick Maloney (D)
 . Chris Gibson (R)
 . Paul Tonko (D)
 . Bill Owens (D)
 . Richard Hanna (R)
 . Thomas Reed (R)
 . Daniel Maffei (D)
 . Louise Slaughter (D)
 . Brian Higgins (D)
 . Chris Collins (R)

North Carolina
 . G. K. Butterfield (D)
 . Renee Ellmers (R)
 . Walter B. Jones Jr. (R)
 . David Price (D)
 . Virginia Foxx (R)
 . Howard Coble (R)
 . Mike McIntyre (D)
 . Richard Hudson (R)
 . Robert Pittenger (R)
 . Patrick McHenry (R)
 . Mark Meadows (R)
 . Mel Watt (D), until January 6, 2014
 Alma Adams (D), from November 12, 2014
 . George Holding (R)

North Dakota
 . Kevin Cramer (R)

Ohio
 . Steve Chabot (R)
 . Brad Wenstrup (R)
 . Joyce Beatty (D)
 . Jim Jordan (R)
 . Bob Latta (R)
 . Bill Johnson (R)
 . Bob Gibbs (R)
 . John Boehner (R)
 . Marcy Kaptur (D)
 . Mike Turner (R)
 . Marcia Fudge (D)
 . Pat Tiberi (R)
 . Tim Ryan (D)
 . David Joyce (R)
 . Steve Stivers (R)
 . Jim Renacci (R)

Oklahoma
 . Jim Bridenstine (R)
 . Markwayne Mullin (R)
 . Frank Lucas (R)
 . Tom Cole (R)
 . James Lankford (R)

Oregon
 . Suzanne Bonamici (D)
 . Greg Walden (R)
 . Earl Blumenauer (D)
 . Peter DeFazio (D)
 . Kurt Schrader (D)

Pennsylvania
 . Bob Brady (D)
 . Chaka Fattah (D)
 . Mike Kelly (R)
 . Scott Perry (R)
 . Glenn Thompson (R)
 . Jim Gerlach (R)
 . Pat Meehan (R)
 . Mike Fitzpatrick (R)
 . Bill Shuster (R)
 . Tom Marino (R)
 . Lou Barletta (R)
 . Keith Rothfus (R)
 . Allyson Schwartz (D)
 . Mike Doyle (D)
 . Charlie Dent (R)
 . Joe Pitts (R)
 . Matt Cartwright (D)
 . Tim Murphy (R)

Rhode Island
 . David Cicilline (D)
 . James Langevin (D)

South Carolina
 . Mark Sanford (R), from May 7, 2013
 . Joe Wilson (R)
 . Jeff Duncan (R)
 . Trey Gowdy (R)
 . Mick Mulvaney (R)
 . Jim Clyburn (D)
 . Tom Rice (R)

South Dakota
 . Kristi Noem (R)

Tennessee
 . Phil Roe (R)
 . Jimmy Duncan (R)
 . Chuck Fleischmann (R)
 . Scott DesJarlais (R)
 . Jim Cooper (D)
 . Diane Black (R)
 . Marsha Blackburn (R)
 . Stephen Fincher (R)
 . Steve Cohen (D)

Texas
 . Louie Gohmert (R)
 . Ted Poe (R)
 . Sam Johnson (R)
 . Ralph Hall (R)
 . Jeb Hensarling (R)
 . Joe Barton (R)
 . John Culberson (R)
 . Kevin Brady (R)
 . Al Green (D)
 . Michael McCaul (R)
 . Mike Conaway (R)
 . Kay Granger (R)
 . Mac Thornberry (R)
 . Randy Weber (R)
 . Ruben Hinojosa (D)
 . Beto O'Rourke (D)
 . Bill Flores (R)
 . Sheila Jackson Lee (D)
 . Randy Neugebauer (R)
 . Joaquin Castro (D)
 . Lamar S. Smith (R)
 . Pete Olson (R)
 . Pete Gallego (D)
 . Kenny Marchant (R)
 . Roger Williams (R)
 . Michael C. Burgess (R)
 . Blake Farenthold (R)
 . Henry Cuellar (D)
 . Gene Green (D)
 . Eddie Bernice Johnson (D)
 . John Carter (R)
 . Pete Sessions (R)
 . Marc Veasey (D)
 . Filemon Vela (D)
 . Lloyd Doggett (D)
 . Steve Stockman (R)

Utah
 . Rob Bishop (R)
 . Chris Stewart (R)
 . Jason Chaffetz (R)
 . Jim Matheson (D)

Vermont
 . Peter Welch (D)

Virginia
 . Rob Wittman (R)
 . Scott Rigell (R)
 . Bobby Scott (D)
 . Randy Forbes (R)
 . Robert Hurt (R)
 . Bob Goodlatte (R)
 . Eric Cantor (R), until August 18, 2014
 Dave Brat (R), from November 12, 2014
 . Jim Moran (D)
 . Morgan Griffith (R)
 . Frank Wolf (R)
 . Gerry Connolly (D)

Washington
 . Suzan DelBene (D)
 . Rick Larsen (D)
 . Jaime Herrera Beutler (R)
 . Doc Hastings (R)
 . Cathy McMorris Rodgers (R)
 . Derek Kilmer (D)
 . Jim McDermott (D)
 . Dave Reichert (R)
 . Adam Smith (D)
 . Dennis Heck (D)

West Virginia
 . David McKinley (R)
 . Shelley Moore Capito (R)
 . Nick Rahall (D)

Wisconsin
 . Paul Ryan (R)
 . Mark Pocan (D)
 . Ron Kind (D)
 . Gwen Moore (D)
 . Jim Sensenbrenner (R)
 . Tom Petri (R)
 . Sean Duffy (R)
 . Reid Ribble (R)

Wyoming
 . Cynthia Lummis (R)

Non-voting members
 . Eni Faleomavaega (D)
 . Eleanor Holmes Norton (D)
 . Madeleine Z. Bordallo (D)
 . Gregorio Sablan (D)
 . Pedro Pierluisi (Resident Commissioner) (D/PNP)
 . Donna Christian-Christensen (D)

Changes in membership

Senate

|-
| Massachusetts(2)
| nowrap  | John Kerry(D)
| Resigned February 1, 2013, to become U.S. Secretary of State.Successor was appointed February 1, 2013, to continue the term.
| nowrap  | Mo Cowan(D)
| February 1, 2013

|-
| New Jersey(2)
| nowrap  | Frank Lautenberg(D)
| Died June 3, 2013.Successor was appointed June 6, 2013, to continue the term.
| nowrap  | Jeffrey Chiesa (R)
| June 10, 2013

|-
| Massachusetts(2)
| nowrap  | Mo Cowan(D)
| Appointment expired July 16, 2013, following a special election.Successor was elected June 25, 2013, to finish the term.
| nowrap  | Ed Markey (D)
| July 16, 2013

|-
| New Jersey(2)
| nowrap  | Jeffrey Chiesa(R)
| Appointment expired October 31, 2013, following a special election.Successor was elected October 16, 2013, to finish the term.
| nowrap  | Cory Booker (D)
| October 31, 2013

|-
| Montana(2)
| nowrap  | Max Baucus(D)
| Resigned February 6, 2014, to become U.S. Ambassador to China. Successor was appointed February 9, 2014, to finish the term.
| nowrap  | John Walsh (D)
| February 11, 2014

|}

House of Representatives

|-
| 
| Vacant
| Jesse Jackson Jr. (D) resigned November 21, 2012, near the end of the previous Congress for health reasons.A special election was held April 9, 2013.
| | Robin Kelly (D)
| April 11, 2013

|-
| 
| Vacant
| Tim Scott (R) resigned January 2, 2013, near the end of the previous Congress, when appointed to the Senate.A special election was held May 7, 2013.
|  | Mark Sanford (R)
| May 15, 2013

|-
| 
| nowrap  | Jo Ann Emerson(R)
| Resigned January 22, 2013, to become president and CEO of the National Rural Electric Cooperative Association.A special election was held June 4, 2013.
|  | Jason Smith (R)
| June 5, 2013

|-
| 
| nowrap  | Ed Markey(D)
| Resigned July 16, 2013, having been elected to the United States Senate in a special election.A special election was held December 10, 2013.
|  | Katherine Clark (D)
| December 12, 2013

|-
| 
| nowrap  | Jo Bonner(R)
| Resigned August 2, 2013, to become a vice chancellor in the University of Alabama System.A special election was held December 17, 2013.
| nowrap  | Bradley Byrne(R)
| January 7, 2014

|-
| 
| nowrap  | Rodney Alexander(R)
| Resigned September 26, 2013, to become the secretary of the Louisiana Department of Veterans Affairs.A special election was held November 16, 2013.
|  | Vance McAllister (R)
| November 21, 2013

|-
| 
| nowrap  | Bill Young(R)
| Died October 18, 2013.A special election was held March 11, 2014.
|  | David Jolly (R)
| March 13, 2014

|-
| 
| nowrap  | Mel Watt (D)
| Resigned January 6, 2014, to become head of the Federal Housing Finance Agency.A special election was held November 4, 2014.
|  | Alma Adams (D)
| November 12, 2014

|-
| 
| nowrap  | Trey Radel (R)
| Resigned January 27, 2014 following a conviction for cocaine possession.A special election was held June 24, 2014.
|  | Curt Clawson (R)
| June 25, 2014

|-
| 
| nowrap  | Rob Andrews(D)
| Resigned February 18, 2014, to take a position at a Philadelphia law firm.A special election was held November 4, 2014.
|  | Donald Norcross(D)
| November 12, 2014

|-
| 
| nowrap  | Eric Cantor(R)
| Resigned August 18, 2014 following his primary defeat.A special election was held November 4, 2014.
|  | Dave Brat(R)
| November 12, 2014

|}

Committees
[Section contents: Senate, House, Joint ]
Listed alphabetically by chamber, including Chairperson and Ranking Member.

Senate

 Agriculture, Nutrition and Forestry: Debbie Stabenow, Thad Cochran
 Commodities, Markets, Trade and Risk Management: Joe Donnelly, Saxby Chambliss
 Conservation, Forestry and Natural Resources: Michael Bennet, John Boozman
 Jobs, Rural Economic Growth and Energy Innovation: Heidi Heitkamp, Mike Johanns
 Livestock, Dairy, Poultry, Marketing and Agriculture Security: Kirsten Gillibrand, Pat Roberts
 Nutrition, Specialty Crops, Food and Agricultural Research: Mo Cowan (then Mark Pryor, then Bob Casey), John Hoeven
 Aging (Special): Bill Nelson, Susan Collins
 Appropriations: Barbara Mikulski, Richard Shelby
 Agriculture, Rural Development, Food and Drug Administration, and Related Agencies: Mark Pryor, Roy Blunt
 Commerce, Justice, Science, and Related Agencies: Jon Tester, Mike Johanns
 Defense: Dick Durbin, Thad Cochran
 Energy and Water Development: Dianne Feinstein, Lamar Alexander
 Financial Services and General Government: Tom Udall, Mike Johanns
 Homeland Security: Mary Landrieu, Dan Coats
 Interior, Environment, and Related Agencies: Jack Reed, Lisa Murkowski
 Labor, Health and Human Services, Education, and Related Agencies: Tom Harkin, Jerry Moran
 Legislative Branch: Jeanne Shaheen, John Hoeven
 Military Construction, Veterans Affairs, and Related Agencies: Tim Johnson, Mark Kirk
 State, Foreign Operations, and Related Programs: Patrick Leahy, Lindsey Graham
 Transportation, Housing and Urban Development, and Related Agencies: Patty Murray, Susan Collins
 Armed Services: Carl Levin, James Inhofe
 Airland: Joe Manchin, Roger Wicker
 Emerging Threats and Capabilities: Kay Hagan, Deb Fischer
 Personnel: Kirsten Gillibrand, Lindsey Graham
 Readiness and Management Support: Jeanne Shaheen, Kelly Ayotte
 SeaPower: Jack Reed, John McCain
 Strategic Forces: Mark Udall, Jeff Sessions
 Banking, Housing, and Urban Affairs: Tim Johnson, Mike Crapo
 Economic Policy: Jeff Merkley, Dean Heller
 Financial Institutions and Consumer Protection: Sherrod Brown, Pat Toomey
 Housing, Transportation, and Community Development: Robert Menendez, Jerry Moran
 Securities, Insurance, and Investment: Jon Tester, Mike Johanns
 Security and International Trade and Finance: Mark Warner, Mark Kirk
 Budget: Patty Murray, Jeff Sessions
 Commerce, Science and Transportation: Jay Rockefeller, John Thune
 Aviation Operations, Safety, and Security: Maria Cantwell, Marco Rubio
 Communications, Technology, and the Internet: Brian Schatz, Tim Scott
 Competitiveness, Innovation, and Export Promotion: Amy Klobuchar, Roy Blunt
 Consumer Protection, Product Safety, and Insurance: Mark Pryor, Kelly Ayotte
 Oceans, Atmosphere, Fisheries, and Coast Guard: Mark Begich, Deb Fischer
 Science and Space: Bill Nelson, Ted Cruz
 Surface Transportation and Merchant Marine Infrastructure, Safety, and Security: Frank Lautenberg (until June 3, 2013) then Richard Blumenthal, Roger Wicker
 Energy and Natural Resources: Mary Landrieu, Lisa Murkowski
 Energy: Al Franken, Jim Risch
 National Parks: Mark Udall, Rob Portman
 Public Lands and Forests: Joe Manchin, Rob Barrasso
 Water and Power: Brian Schatz, Mike Lee

 Environment and Public Works: Barbara Boxer, David Vitter
 Clean Air and Nuclear Safety: Tom Carper, Jeff Sessions
 Green Jobs and the New Economy: Jeff Merkley, Roger Wicker
 Oversight: Sheldon Whitehouse, Jim Inhofe
 Superfund, Toxics and Environmental Health: Frank Lautenberg (until June 3, 2013) then Tom Udall, Mike Crapo
 Transportation and Infrastructure: Vacant, John Barrasso
 Water and Wildlife: Ben Cardin, John Boozman
 Ethics (Select): Barbara Boxer, Johnny Isakson
 Finance: Ron Wyden, Orrin Hatch
 Health Care: Jay Rockefeller, Pat Roberts
 International Trade, Customs, and Global Competitiveness: Ron Wyden, Johnny Isakson
 Energy, Natural Resources, and Infrastructure: Debbie Stabenow, John Cornyn
 Social Security, Pensions, and Family Policy: Sherrod Brown, Pat Toomey
 Taxation and IRS Oversight: Michael Bennet, Mike Enzi
 Fiscal Responsibility and Economic Growth: Bob Casey, Rob Portman
 Foreign Relations: Bob Menendez, Bob Corker
 African Affairs: Chris Coons, Jeff Flake
 East Asian and Pacific Affairs: Ben Cardin, Marco Rubio
 European Affairs: Chris Murphy, Ron Johnson
 International Development and Foreign Assistance, Economic Affairs and International Environmental Protection, and Peace Corps: Tim Kaine, John Barrasso
 International Operations and Organizations, Human Rights, Democracy and Global Women's Issues: Barbara Boxer, Rand Paul
 Near Eastern and South and Central Asian Affairs: Bob Casey, Jim Risch
 Western Hemisphere and Global Narcotics Affairs: Tom Udall, John McCain
 Health, Education, Labor, and Pensions: Tom Harkin, Lamar Alexander
 Subcommittee on Children and Families: Kay Hagan, Mike Enzi
 Subcommittee on Employment and Workplace Safety: Bob Casey, Johnny Isakson
 Subcommittee on Primary Health and Aging: Bernie Sanders, Richard Burr
 Homeland Security and Governmental Affairs: Tom Carper, Tom Coburn
 Investigations (Permanent): Carl Levin, John McCain
 Financial and Contracting Oversight: Claire McCaskill, Ron Johnson
 Efficiency and Effectiveness of Federal Programs and the Federal Workforce: Jon Tester, Rob Portman
 Emergency Management, Intergovernmental Relations, and the District of Columbia: Mark Begich, Rand Paul
 Indian Affairs: Jon Tester, John Barrasso
 Intelligence (Select): Dianne Feinstein, Saxby Chambliss
 Judiciary: Patrick Leahy, Chuck Grassley
 Administrative Oversight and the Courts: Chris Coons, Jeff Sessions
 Antitrust, Competition Policy and Consumer Rights: Amy Klobuchar, Mike Lee
 The Constitution, Civil Rights and Human Rights: Dick Durbin, Ted Cruz
 Crime and Terrorism: Sheldon Whitehouse, Lindsey Graham
 Immigration, Refugees and Border Security: Chuck Schumer, John Cornyn
 Oversight, Federal Rights and Agency Activities: Richard Blumenthal, Orrin Hatch
 Privacy, Technology and the Law: Al Franken, Jeff Flake
 Rules and Administration: Chuck Schumer, Pat Roberts
 Small Business and Entrepreneurship: Maria Cantwell, Jim Risch
 Veterans' Affairs: Bernie Sanders, Richard Burr

House of Representatives

Sources: , 

 Agriculture: Frank Lucas, Collin Peterson
 Conservation, Energy, and Forestry: Glenn Thompson, Tim Walz
 Department Operations, Oversight, and Nutrition: Steve King, Marcia Fudge
 General Farm Commodities and Risk Management: Mike Conaway, David Scott
 Horticulture, Research, Biotechnology, and Foreign Agriculture: Austin Scott, Kurt Schrader
 Livestock, Rural Development, and Credit: Rick Crawford, Jim Costa
 Appropriations: Hal Rogers, Nita Lowey
 Agriculture, Rural Development, Food and Drug Administration, and Related Agencies: Robert Aderholt, Sam Farr
 Commerce, Justice, Science, and Related Agencies: Frank Wolf, Chaka Fattah
 Defense: Rodney Frelinghuysen, Pete Visclosky
 Energy and Water Development: Rodney Frelinghuysen, Marcy Kaptur
 Financial Services and General Government: Ander Crenshaw, José Serrano
 Homeland Security: John Carter, David Price
 Interior, Environment, and Related Agencies: Mike Simpson, Jim Moran
 Labor, Health and Human Services, Education, and Related Agencies: Jack Kingston, Rosa DeLauro
 Legislative Branch: Rodney Alexander, Debbie Wasserman Schultz
 Military Construction, Veterans Affairs, and Related Agencies: John Culberson, Sanford Bishop
 State, Foreign Operations, and Related Programs: Kay Granger, Nita Lowey
 Transportation, Housing and Urban Development, and Related Agencies: Tom Latham, Ed Pastor
 Armed Services: Buck McKeon, Adam Smith
 Tactical Air and Land Forces: Mike Turner, Loretta Sanchez
 Military Personnel: Joe Wilson, Susan Davis
 Oversight and Investigations: Martha Roby, Niki Tsongas
 Readiness: Rob Wittman, Madeleine Bordallo
 Seapower and Projection Forces: Randy Forbes, Mike McIntyre
 Strategic Forces: Mike Rogers, Jim Cooper
 Emerging Threats and Capabilities: Mac Thornberry, Jim Langevin
 Budget: Paul Ryan, Chris Van Hollen
 Education and the Workforce: John Kline Ranking: George Miller
 Early Childhood, Elementary and Secondary Education: Todd Rokita, Carolyn McCarthy
 Workforce Protections: Tim Walberg, Joe Courtney
 Higher Education and Workforce Training: Virginia Foxx, Ruben Hinojosa
 Health, Employment, Labor, and Pensions: Phil Roe, Rob Andrews
 Energy and Commerce: Fred Upton, Henry Waxman
 Commerce, Manufacturing and Trade: Lee Terry, Jan Schakowsky
 Communications and Technology: Greg Walden, Anna Eshoo
 Energy and Power: Ed Whitfield, Bobby Rush
 Environment and the Economy: John Shimkus, Paul Tonko
 Health: Joe Pitts, Frank Pallone
 Oversight and Investigations: Tim Murphy, Diana DeGette
 Ethics: Mike Conaway, Linda Sanchez
 Financial Services: Jeb Hensarling, Maxine Waters
 Capital Markets and Government-Sponsored Enterprises: Scott Garrett, Carolyn Maloney
 Financial Institutions and Consumer Credit: Shelley Moore Capito, Gregory Meeks
 Housing and Insurance: Randy Neugebauer, Mike Capuano
 Monetary Policy and Trade: John Campbell, Lacy Clay
 Oversight and Investigations: Patrick McHenry, Al Green
 Foreign Affairs: Ed Royce, Eliot Engel
 Africa, Global Health, and Human Rights: Chris Smith, Karen Bass
 Asia and the Pacific: Steve Chabot, Eni Faleomavaega
 Europe, Eurasia and Emerging Threats: Dana Rohrabacher, Bill Keating
 Middle East and North Africa: Ileana Ros-Lehtinen, Ted Deutch
 Terrorism, Nonproliferation, and Trade: Ted Poe, Brad Sherman
 Western Hemisphere: Matt Salmon, Albio Sires
 Homeland Security: Michael McCaul, Bennie Thompson
 Border and Maritime Security: Candice Miller, Sheila Jackson Lee
 Counterterrorism and Intelligence: Peter King, Brian Higgins
 Cybersecurity, Infrastructure Protection, and Security Technologies: Patt Meehan, Yvette Clarke
 Emergency Preparedness, Response, and Communications: Susan Brooke, Donald Payne
 Oversight and Management Efficiency: Jeff Duncan, Ron Barber
 Transportation Security: Richard Hudson, Cedric Richmond

 House Administration: Candice Miller, Bob Brady
 Intelligence (Permanent Select): Mike Rogers, Dutch Ruppersberger
 Oversight: Lynn Westmoreland, Jan Schakowsky
 Technical and Tactical Intelligence: Joe Heck, Adam Schiff
 Terrorism, HUMINT, Analysis and Counterintelligence: Mike Conaway, Mike Thompson
 Judiciary: Bob Goodlatte, John Conyers
 The Constitution and Civil Justice: Trent Franks, Jerrold Nadler
 Courts, Intellectual Property and the Internet: Howard Coble, Mel Watt (until January 6, 2014)
 Crime, Terrorism, Homeland Security and Investigations: Jim Sensenbrenner, Bobby Scott
 Immigration Policy and Border Security: Trey Gowdy, Zoe Lofgren
 Regulatory Reform, Commercial and Antitrust Law: Spencer Bachus, Steve Cohen
 Natural Resources: Doc Hastings, Ed Markey, until July 15, 2013, then Peter DeFazio
 Energy and Mineral Resources: Doug Lamborn, Rush Holt
 Fisheries, Wildlife, Oceans and Insular Affairs: John Fleming, Gregorio Sablan
 Indian and Alaska Native Affairs: Don Young, Colleen Hanabusa
 Public Lands and Environmental Regulation: Rob Bishop, Raul Grijalva
 Water and Power: Tom McClintock, Grace Napolitano
 Oversight and Government Reform: Darrell Issa, Elijah Cummings
 Federal Workforce, U.S. Postal Service and the Census: Blake Farenthold, Stephen Lynch
 Government Operations: John Mica, Gerry Connolly
 Energy Policy, Health Care and Entitlements: James Lankford, Jackie Speier
 National Security: Jason Chaffetz, John Tierney
 Economic Growth, Job Creation and Regulatory Affairs: Jim Jordan, Matt Cartwright
 Rules: Pete Sessions, Louise Slaughter
 Legislative and Budget Process: Pete Sessions, Alcee Hastings
 Rules and the Organization of the House: Rich Nugent, Jim McGovern
 Science, Space and Technology: Lamar Smith, Eddie Bernice Johnson
 Energy: Cynthia Lummis, Eric Swalwell
 Environment: Andy Harris, Suzanne Bonamici
 Oversight: Paul Broun, Dan Maffei
 Research: Larry Bucshon, Dan Lipinski
 Space: Steve Palazzo, Donna Edwards
 Technology: Thomas Massie, Frederica Wilson
 Small Business: Sam Graves, Nydia Velázquez
 Agriculture, Energy and Trade: Scott Tipton, Patrick Murphy
 Healthcare and Technology: Chris Collins, Janice Hahn
 Economic Growth, Tax and Capital Access: Tom Rice, Judy Chu
 Contracting and Workforce: Richard Hanna, Grace Meng
 Investigations, Oversight and Regulations: David Schweikert, Yvette Clarke
 Transportation and Infrastructure: Bill Shuster, Nick Rahall
 Aviation: Frank LoBiondo, Rick Larsen
 Coast Guard and Maritime Transportation: Duncan Hunter, John Garamendi
 Economic Development, Public Buildings and Emergency Management: Lou Barletta, Eleanor Holmes Norton
 Highways and Transit: Thomas Petri, Peter DeFazio
 Railroads, Pipelines, and Hazardous Materials: Jeff Denham, Corinne Brown
 Water Resources and Environment: Bob Gibbs, Tim Bishop
 Veterans' Affairs: Jeff Miller, Mike Michaud
 Disability Assistance and Memorial Affairs: Jon Runyan, Dina Titus
 Economic Opportunity: Bill Flores, Mark Takano
 Health: Dan Benishek, Julia Brownley
 Oversight and Investigations: Mike Coffman, Ann Kirkpatrick
 Ways and Means: Dave Camp, Sander Levin
 Trade: Devin Nunes, Charlie Rangel
 Social Security: Sam Johnson, Xavier Becerra
 Oversight: Charles Boustany, John Lewis
 Health: Kevin Brady, Jim McDermott
 Human Resources: David Reichert, Lloyd Doggett
 Select Revenue Measures: Pat Tiberi, Richard Neal
 Whole

Joint committees

 Economic: Kevin Brady, Amy Klobuchar
 Inaugural Ceremonies (Special): Chuck Schumer, Lamar Alexander
 The Library: Gregg Harper, Chuck Schumer
 Printing: Chuck Schumer, Gregg Harper
 Taxation: Max Baucus, then Ron Wyden, Dave Camp

Caucuses

Employees

Legislative branch agency directors
 Architect of the Capitol: Stephen T. Ayers
 Attending Physician of the United States Congress: Brian Monahan
 Comptroller General of the United States: Eugene Louis Dodaro
 Director of the Congressional Budget Office: Keith Hall
 Librarian of Congress: James H. Billington
 Public Printer of the United States: Davita E. Vance-Cooks

Senate
 Chaplain: Barry C. Black (Seventh-day Adventist)
 Curator: Diane K. Skvarla, until January 27, 2014 
 Melinda Smith, starting January 27, 2014
 Historian: Donald A. Ritchie
 Librarian: Leona I. Faust
 Parliamentarian: Elizabeth MacDonough
 Secretary: Nancy Erickson
 Secretary for the Majority: Gary B. Myrick
 Secretary for the Minority: David J. Schiappa, until August 1, 2013 
 Laura C. Dove, from August 1, 2013
 Sergeant at Arms: Terrance W. Gainer, until May 2, 2014 
 Andrew B. Willison, from May 2, 2014

House of Representatives
 Chaplain: Patrick J. Conroy (Roman Catholic)
 Chief Administrative Officer: Daniel J. Strodel, until January 6, 2014 
 Ed Cassidy, from January 6, 2014
 Clerk: Karen L. Haas
 Historian: Matthew Wasniewski
 Inspector General: Theresa M. Grafenstine
 Parliamentarian: Thomas J. Wickham Jr.
 Reading Clerks: Susan Cole and Joseph Novotny
 Sergeant at Arms: Paul D. Irving

See also

Elections
 2012 United States elections (elections leading to this Congress)
 2012 United States presidential election
 2012 United States Senate elections
 2012 United States House of Representatives elections
 2014 United States elections (elections during this Congress, leading to the next Congress)
 2014 United States Senate elections
 2014 United States House of Representatives elections

Membership lists
 List of new members of the 113th United States Congress

Notes

References

External links

 Bills and Resolutions:
 House Amendments 
 House Bills 
 House Concurrent Resolutions 
 House Joint Resolutions 
 House Resolutions 
 Senate Concurrent Resolutions 
 Senate Resolutions 
 Roll Call Votes:
 House
 Senate